Denys Molchanov and Andrey Rublev were the defending champions, but they chose to compete with different partners.

Molchanov competed alongside Radu Albot while Rublev played with Frances Tiafoe. Molchanov and Albot lost in the quarterfinals to Nicolas Meister and Eric Quigley while Rublev and Tiafoe lost in the first round to Hans Hach Verdugo and Dennis Novikov. 

Nicolas Meister and Eric Quigley went on to win the title, defeating Sekou Bangoura and Dean O'Brien in the final 6–1, 6–1.

Seeds

Draw

References
 Main Draw
 Qualifying Draw

RBC Tennis Championships of Dallas - Doubles
2016 Doubles